Wassily Wassilyevich Kandinsky ( – 13 December 1944) was a Russian painter and art theorist. Kandinsky is generally credited as one of the pioneers of abstraction in western art, possibly after Hilma af Klint. Born in Moscow, he spent his childhood in Odessa, where he graduated at Grekov Odessa Art School. He enrolled at the University of Moscow, studying law and economics. Successful in his profession—he was offered a professorship (chair of Roman Law) at the University of Dorpat (today Tartu, Estonia)—Kandinsky began painting studies (life-drawing, sketching and anatomy) at the age of 30.

In 1896, Kandinsky settled in Munich, studying first at Anton Ažbe's private school and then at the Academy of Fine Arts. He returned to Moscow in 1914, after the outbreak of World War I. Following the Russian Revolution, Kandinsky "became an insider in the cultural administration of Anatoly Lunacharsky" and helped establish the Museum of the Culture of Painting. However, by then "his spiritual outlook... was foreign to the argumentative materialism of Soviet society", and opportunities beckoned in Germany, to which he returned in 1920. There he taught at the Bauhaus school of art and architecture from 1922 until the Nazis closed it in 1933. He then moved to France, where he lived for the rest of his life, becoming a French citizen in 1939 and producing some of his most prominent art. He died in Neuilly-sur-Seine in 1944, three days prior to his 78th birthday.

Early life
Kandinsky was born in Moscow, Russia and was the son of Lidia Ticheeva and Vasily Silvestrovich Kandinsky, a tea merchant. One of his great-grandmothers was Princess Gantimurova, a Mongolian princess. Kandinsky learned from a variety of sources while in Moscow. He studied many fields while in school, including law and economics. Later in life, he would recall being fascinated and stimulated by colour as a child. His fascination with colour symbolism and psychology continued as he grew.

In 1889 at age 25, he was part of an ethnographic research group which travelled to the Vologda region north of Moscow. In Looks on the Past, he relates that the houses and churches were decorated with such shimmering colours that upon entering them, he felt that he was moving into a painting. This experience, and his study of the region's folk art (particularly the use of bright colours on a dark background), were reflected in much of his early work.

A few years later he first likened painting to composing music in the manner for which he would become noted, writing, "Colour is the keyboard, the eyes are the hammers, the soul is the piano with many strings. The artist is the hand which plays, touching one key or another, to cause vibrations in the soul".

Kandinsky was also the uncle of Russian-French philosopher Alexandre Kojève (1902–1968).

Artistic periods 
Kandinsky's creation of abstract work followed a long period of development and maturation of intense thought based on his artistic experiences. He called this devotion to inner beauty, fervor of spirit, and spiritual desire inner necessity; it was a central aspect of his art. Some art historians suggest that Kandinsky's passion for Abstract art began when one day, coming back home, he found one of his own paintings hanging upside down in his studio, and he stared at it for a while before realizing it was his own work, suggesting to him the potential power of abstraction.

In 1896, at the age of 30, Kandinsky gave up a promising career teaching law and economics to enroll in the Munich Academy where his teachers would eventually include Franz von Stuck. He was not immediately granted admission, and began learning art on his own. That same year, before leaving Moscow, he saw an exhibit of paintings by Monet. He was particularly taken with the impressionistic style of Haystacks; this, to him, had a powerful sense of colour almost independent of the objects themselves. Later, he would write about this experience:

Kandinsky was similarly influenced during this period by Richard Wagner's Lohengrin which, he felt, pushed the limits of music and melody beyond standard lyricism. He was also spiritually influenced by Madame Blavatsky (1831–1891), the best-known exponent of theosophy. Theosophical theory postulates that creation is a geometrical progression, beginning with a single point. The creative aspect of the form is expressed by a descending series of circles, triangles, and squares. Kandinsky's book Concerning the Spiritual in Art (1910) and Point and Line to Plane (1926) echoed this theosophical tenet. Illustrations by John Varley in Thought-Forms (1901) influenced him visually.

Metamorphosis 

In the summer of 1902, Kandinsky invited Gabriele Münter to join him at his summer painting classes just south of Munich in the Alps. She accepted, and their relationship became more personal than professional.
Art school, usually considered difficult, was easy for Kandinsky. It was during this time that he began to emerge as an art theorist as well as a painter. The number of his existing paintings increased at the beginning of the 20th century; much remains of the landscapes and towns he painted, using broad swaths of colour and recognisable forms. For the most part, however, Kandinsky's paintings did not feature any human figures; an exception is Sunday, Old Russia (1904), in which Kandinsky recreates a highly colourful (and fanciful) view of peasants and nobles in front of the walls of a town. Couple on Horseback (1907) depicts a man on horseback, holding a woman with tenderness and care as they ride past a Russian town with luminous walls across a blue river. The horse is muted while the leaves in the trees, the town, and the reflections in the river glisten with spots of colour and brightness. This work demonstrates the influence of pointillism in the way the depth of field is collapsed into a flat, luminescent surface. Fauvism is also apparent in these early works. Colours are used to express Kandinsky's experience of subject matter, not to describe objective nature.

Perhaps the most important of his paintings from the first decade of the 1900s was The Blue Rider (1903), which shows a small cloaked figure on a speeding horse rushing through a rocky meadow. The rider's cloak is medium blue, which casts a darker-blue shadow. In the foreground are more amorphous blue shadows, the counterparts of the fall trees in the background. The blue rider in the painting is prominent (but not clearly defined), and the horse has an unnatural gait (which Kandinsky must have known). Some art historians believe  that a second figure (perhaps a child) is being held by the rider, although this may be another shadow from the solitary rider. This intentional disjunction, allowing viewers to participate in the creation of the artwork, became an increasingly conscious technique used by Kandinsky in subsequent years; it culminated in the abstract works of the 1911–1914 period. In The Blue Rider, Kandinsky shows the rider more as a series of colours than in specific detail. This painting is not exceptional in that regard when compared with contemporary painters, but it shows the direction Kandinsky would take only a few years later.

From 1906 to 1908 Kandinsky spent a great deal of time travelling across Europe (he was an associate of the Blue Rose symbolist group of Moscow), until he settled in the small Bavarian town of Murnau. In 1908 he bought a copy of Thought-Forms by Annie Besant and Charles Webster Leadbeater. In 1909 he joined the Theosophical Society. The Blue Mountain (1908–1909) was painted at this time, demonstrating his trend toward abstraction. A mountain of blue is flanked by two broad trees, one yellow and one red. A procession, with three riders and several others, crosses at the bottom. The faces, clothing, and saddles of the riders are each a single color, and neither they nor the walking figures display any real detail. The flat planes and the contours also are indicative of Fauvist influence. The broad use of color in The Blue Mountain illustrates Kandinsky's inclination toward an art in which colour is presented independently of form, and in which each color is given equal attention. The composition is more planar; the painting is divided into four sections: the sky, the red tree, the yellow tree, and the blue mountain with the three riders.

Blue Rider Period (1911–1914) 

Kandinsky's paintings from this period are large, expressive coloured masses evaluated independently from forms and lines; these serve no longer to delimit them, but overlap freely to form paintings of extraordinary force. Music was important to the birth of abstract art, since music is abstract by nature—it does not try to represent the exterior world, but expresses in an immediate way the inner feelings of the soul. Kandinsky sometimes used musical terms to identify his works; he called his most spontaneous paintings "improvisations" and described more elaborate works as "compositions."

In addition to painting, Kandinsky was an art theorist; his influence on the history of Western art stems perhaps more from his theoretical works than from his paintings. He helped found the Neue Künstlervereinigung München (Munich New Artists' Association), becoming its president in 1909. However, the group could not integrate the radical approach of Kandinsky (and others) with conventional artistic concepts and the group dissolved in late 1911. Kandinsky then formed a new group, the Blue Rider (Der Blaue Reiter) with like-minded artists such as August Macke, Franz Marc, Albert Bloch, and Gabriele Münter. The group released an almanac (The Blue Rider Almanac) and held two exhibits. More of each were planned, but the outbreak of World War I in 1914 ended these plans and sent Kandinsky back to Russia via Switzerland and Sweden.

His writing in The Blue Rider Almanac and the treatise "On the Spiritual in Art" (which was released in 1910) were both a defence and promotion of abstract art and an affirmation that all forms of art were equally capable of reaching a level of spirituality. He believed that colour could be used in a painting as something autonomous, apart from the visual description of an object or other form.

These ideas had an almost-immediate international impact, particularly in the English-speaking world. As early as 1912, On the Spiritual in Art was reviewed by Michael Sadleir in the London-based Art News. Interest in Kandinsky grew apace when Sadleir published an English translation of On the Spiritual in Art in 1914. Extracts from the book were published that year in Percy Wyndham Lewis's periodical Blast, and Alfred Orage's weekly cultural newspaper The New Age. Kandinsky had received some notice earlier in Britain, however; in 1910, he participated in the Allied Artists' Exhibition (organised by Frank Rutter) at London's Royal Albert Hall. This resulted in his work being singled out for praise in a review of that show by the artist Spencer Frederick Gore in The Art News.

Sadleir's interest in Kandinsky also led to Kandinsky's first works entering a British art collection; Sadleir's father, Michael Sadler, acquired several wood-prints and the abstract painting Fragment for Composition VII in 1913 following a visit by father and son to meet Kandinsky in Munich that year. These works were displayed in Leeds, either in the university or the premises of the Leeds Arts Club, between 1913 and 1923.

Return to Russia (1914–1921) 

In 1916, he met Nina Andreevskaya (1899–1980), whom he married on 11 February 1917.

From 1918 to 1921, Kandinsky was involved in the cultural politics of Russia and collaborated in art education and museum reform. He painted little during this period, but devoted his time to artistic teaching, with a program based on form and colour analysis; he also helped organize the Institute of Artistic Culture in Moscow of which he was the first director. His spiritual, expressionistic view of art was ultimately rejected by the radical members of the institute as too individualistic and bourgeois. In 1921, Kandinsky was invited to go to Germany to attend the Bauhaus of Weimar by its founder, architect Walter Gropius.

Back in Germany and the Bauhaus (1922–1933) 

In May 1922, he attended the International Congress of Progressive Artists and signed the "Founding Proclamation of the Union of Progressive International Artists".

Kandinsky taught the basic design class for beginners and the course on advanced theory at the Bauhaus; he also conducted painting classes and a workshop in which he augmented his colour theory with new elements of form psychology. The development of his works on forms study, particularly on points and line forms, led to the publication of his second theoretical book (Point and Line to Plane) in 1926. His examinations of the effects of forces on straight lines, leading to the contrasting tones of curved and angled lines, coincided with the research of Gestalt psychologists, whose work was also discussed at the Bauhaus. Geometrical elements took on increasing importance in both his teaching and painting—particularly the circle, half-circle, the angle, straight lines and curves. This period was intensely productive. This freedom is characterised in his works by the treatment of planes rich in colours and gradations—as in Yellow – red – blue (1925), where Kandinsky illustrates his distance from the constructivism and suprematism movements influential at the time.

The  Yellow – red – blue (1925) of several main forms: a vertical yellow rectangle, an inclined red cross and a large dark blue circle; a multitude of straight (or sinuous) black lines, circular arcs, monochromatic circles and scattered, coloured checker-boards contribute to its delicate complexity. This simple visual identification of forms and the main coloured masses present on the canvas is only a first approach to the inner reality of the work, whose appreciation necessitates deeper observation—not only of forms and colours involved in the painting but their relationship, their absolute and relative positions on the canvas and their harmony.

Kandinsky was one of Die Blaue Vier (Blue Four), formed in 1923 with Paul Klee, Lyonel Feininger and Alexej von Jawlensky, which lectured and exhibited in the United States in 1924. Due to right-wing hostility, the Bauhaus left Weimar and settled in Dessau in 1925. Following a Nazi smear campaign the Bauhaus left Dessau in 1932 for Berlin, until its dissolution in July 1933. Kandinsky then left Germany, settling in Paris.

Great Synthesis (1934–1944) 

Living in an apartment in Paris, Kandinsky created his work in a living-room studio. Biomorphic forms with supple, non-geometric outlines appear in his paintings—forms which suggest microscopic organisms but express the artist's inner life. Kandinsky used original colour compositions, evoking Slavic popular art. He also occasionally mixed sand with paint to give a granular, rustic texture to his paintings.

This period corresponds to a synthesis of Kandinsky's previous work in which he used all elements, enriching them. In 1936 and 1939 he painted his final two major compositions, the type of elaborate canvases he had not produced for many years. Composition IX has highly contrasted, powerful diagonals whose central form gives the impression of an embryo in the womb. Small squares of colours and coloured bands stand out against the black background of Composition X as star fragments (or filaments), while enigmatic hieroglyphs with pastel tones cover a large maroon mass which seems to float in the upper-left corner of the canvas. In Kandinsky's work some characteristics are obvious, while certain touches are more discreet and veiled; they reveal themselves only progressively to those who deepen their connection with his work. He intended his forms (which he subtly harmonised and placed) to resonate with the observer's soul.

Kandinsky's conception of art

The artist as prophet 

Writing that "music is the ultimate teacher," Kandinsky embarked upon the first seven of his ten Compositions. The first three survive only in black-and-white photographs taken by fellow artist and friend Gabriele Münter. Composition I (1910) was destroyed by a British air raid on the city of Braunschweig in Lower Saxony on the night of 14 October 1944.

While studies, sketches, and improvisations exist (particularly of Composition II), a Nazi raid on the Bauhaus in the 1930s resulted in the confiscation of Kandinsky's first three Compositions. They were displayed in the State-sponsored exhibit "Degenerate Art", and then destroyed (along with works by Paul Klee, Franz Marc and other modern artists)

Fascinated by Christian eschatology and the perception of a coming New Age, a common theme among Kandinsky's first seven Compositions is the apocalypse (the end of the world as we know it). Writing of the "artist as prophet" in his book, Concerning the Spiritual in Art, Kandinsky created paintings in the years immediately preceding World War I showing a coming cataclysm which would alter individual and social reality. Having a devout belief in Orthodox Christianity, Kandinsky drew upon the biblical stories of Noah's Ark, Jonah and the whale, Christ's resurrection, the four horsemen of the Apocalypse in the book of Revelation, Russian folktales and the common mythological experiences of death and rebirth. Never attempting to picture any one of these stories as a narrative, he used their veiled imagery as symbols of the archetypes of death–rebirth and destruction–creation he felt were imminent in the pre-World War I world.

As he stated in Concerning the Spiritual in Art (see below), Kandinsky felt that an authentic artist creating art from "an internal necessity" inhabits the tip of an upward-moving pyramid. This progressing pyramid is penetrating and proceeding into the future. What was odd or inconceivable yesterday is commonplace today; what is avant garde today (and understood only by the few) is common knowledge tomorrow. The modern artist–prophet stands alone at the apex of the pyramid, making new discoveries and ushering in tomorrow's reality. Kandinsky was aware of recent scientific developments and the advances of modern artists who had contributed to radically new ways of seeing and experiencing the world.

Composition IV and later paintings are primarily concerned with evoking a spiritual resonance in viewer and artist. As in his painting of the apocalypse by water (Composition VI), Kandinsky puts the viewer in the situation of experiencing these epic myths by translating them into contemporary terms (with a sense of desperation, flurry, urgency, and confusion). This spiritual communion of viewer-painting-artist/prophet may be described within the limits of words and images.

Artistic and spiritual theorist 

As the Der Blaue Reiter Almanac essays and theorising with composer Arnold Schoenberg indicate, Kandinsky also expressed the communion between artist and viewer as being available to both the senses and the mind (synesthesia). Hearing tones and chords as he painted, Kandinsky theorised that (for example), yellow is the colour of middle C on a brassy trumpet; black is the colour of closure, and the end of things; and that combinations of colours produce vibrational frequencies, akin to chords played on a piano. In 1871 the young Kandinsky learned to play the piano and cello.

Kandinsky also developed a theory of geometric figures and their relationships—claiming, for example, that the circle is the most peaceful shape and represents the human soul. These theories are explained in Point and Line to Plane (see below).

Kandinsky's legendary stage design for a performance of Mussorgsky's "Pictures at an Exhibition" illustrates his synaesthetic concept of a universal correspondence of forms, colors and musical sounds. In 1928 in the theater of Dessau, Wassily Kandinsky realized the stage production of "Pictures at an Exhibition". In 2015 the original designs of the stage elements were animated with modern video technology and synchronized with the music according to the preparatory notes of Kandinsky and the director's script of Felix Klee.

In another episode with Münter during the Bavarian abstract expressionist years, Kandinsky was working on his Composition VI. From nearly six months of study and preparation, he had intended the work to evoke a flood, baptism, destruction, and rebirth simultaneously. After outlining the work on a mural-sized wood panel, he became blocked and could not go on. Münter told him that he was trapped in his intellect and not reaching the true subject of the picture. She suggested he simply repeat the word uberflut ("deluge" or "flood") and focus on its sound rather than its meaning. Repeating this word like a mantra, Kandinsky painted and completed the monumental work in a three-day span.

Signature style 
Wassily Kandinsky's art has a confluence of music and spirituality. With his appreciation for music of his times and kinesthetic disposition, Kandinsky's artworks have a marked style of expressionism in his early years. But he embraced all types of artistic styles of his times and his predecessors i.e. Art Nouveau (sinuous organic forms), Fauvism and Blaue Reiter (shocking colours), Surrealism (mystery) and Bauhaus (constructivism) only to move towards abstractionism as he explored spirituality in art. His object-free paintings display spiritual abstraction suggested by sounds and emotions through a unity of sensation. Driven by the Christian faith and the inner necessity of an artist, his paintings have the ambiguity of the form rendered in a variety of colours as well as resistance against conventional aesthetic values of the art world.

His signature or individual style can be further defined and divided into three categories over the course of his art career: Impressions (representational element), Improvisations (spontaneous emotional reaction), Compositions (ultimate works of art).

As Kandinsky started moving away from his early inspiration from Impressionism, his paintings became more vibrant, pictographic and expressive with more sharp shapes and clear linear qualities.

But eventually, Kandinsky went further; rejecting pictorial representation with more synesthetic swirling hurricanes of colours and shapes, eliminating traditional references to depth, laying out bare and abstracted glyphs; but what remained consistent was his spiritual pursuit of expressive forms. 

Emotional harmony is another salient feature in the later works of Kandinsky. With diverse dimensions and bright hues balanced through a careful juxtaposition of proportion and colours, he substantiated the universality of shapes in his artworks thus paving the way for further abstraction.

Wassily Kandinsky often used black in his paintings to heighten the impact of brightly coloured forms while his forms were often biomorphic approaches to bring surrealism in his art.

Theoretical writings on art 
Kandinsky's analyses on forms and colours result not from simple, arbitrary idea-associations but from the painter's inner experience. He spent years creating abstract, sensorially rich paintings, working with form and colour, tirelessly observing his own paintings and those of other artists, noting their effects on his sense of colour. This subjective experience is something that anyone can do—not scientific, objective observations but inner, subjective ones, what French philosopher Michel Henry calls  "absolute subjectivity" or the "absolute phenomenological life".

Concerning the spiritual in art 

Published in Munich in 1911, Kandinsky's text, Über das Geistige in der Kunst, defines three types of painting; impressions, improvisations and compositions. While impressions are based on an external reality that serves as a starting point, improvisations and compositions depict images emergent from the unconscious, though composition is developed from a more formal point of view. Kandinsky compares the spiritual life of humanity to a pyramid—the artist has a mission to lead others to the pinnacle with his work. The point of the pyramid is those few, great artists. It is a spiritual pyramid, advancing and ascending slowly even if it sometimes appears immobile. During decadent periods, the soul sinks to the bottom of the pyramid; humanity searches only for external success, ignoring spiritual forces.

Colours on the painter's palette evoke a double effect: a purely physical effect on the eye which is charmed by the beauty of colours, similar to the joyful impression when we eat a delicacy. This effect can be much deeper, however, causing a vibration of the soul or an "inner resonance"—a spiritual effect in which the colour touches the soul itself.

"Inner necessity" is, for Kandinsky, the principle of art and the foundation of forms and the harmony of colours. He defines it as the principle of efficient contact of the form with the human soul. Every form is the delimitation of a surface by another one; it possesses an inner content, the effect it produces on one who looks at it attentively. This inner necessity is the right of the artist to unlimited freedom, but this freedom becomes licence if it is not founded on such a necessity. Art is born from the inner necessity of the artist in an enigmatic, mystical way through which it acquires an autonomous life; it becomes an independent subject, animated by a spiritual breath.

The obvious properties we can see when we look at an isolated colour and let it act alone, on one side is the warmth or coldness of the colour tone, and on the other side is the clarity or obscurity of that tone. Warmth is a tendency towards yellow, and coldness a tendency towards blue; yellow and blue form the first great, dynamic contrast. Yellow has an eccentric movement and blue a concentric movement; a yellow surface seems to move closer to us, while a blue surface seems to move away. Yellow is a typically terrestrial colour, whose violence can be painful and aggressive. Blue is a celestial colour, evoking a deep calm. The combination of blue and yellow yields total immobility and calm, which is green.

Clarity is a tendency towards white, and obscurity is a tendency towards black. White and black form the second great contrast, which is static. White is a deep, absolute silence, full of possibility. Black is nothingness without possibility, an eternal silence without hope, and corresponds with death. Any other colour resonates strongly on its neighbors. The mixing of white with black leads to gray, which possesses no active force and whose tonality is near that of green. Gray corresponds to immobility without hope; it tends to despair when it becomes dark, regaining little hope when it lightens.

Red is a warm colour, lively and agitated; it is forceful, a movement in itself. Mixed with black it becomes brown, a hard colour. Mixed with yellow, it gains in warmth and becomes orange, which imparts an irradiating movement on its surroundings. When red is mixed with blue it moves away from man to become purple, which is a cool red. Red and green form the third great contrast, and orange and purple the fourth.

Point and Line to Plane 

In his writings, published in Munich by Verlag Albert Langen in 1926, Kandinsky analyzed the geometrical elements which make up every painting—the point and the line. He called the physical support and the material surface on which the artist draws or paints the basic plane, or BP. He did not analyze them objectively, but from the point of view of their inner effect on the observer.

A point is a small bit of colour put by the artist on the canvas. It is neither a geometric point nor a mathematical abstraction; it is extension, form and colour. This form can be a square, a triangle, a circle, a star or something more complex. The point is the most concise form but, according to its placement on the basic plane, it will take a different tonality. It can be isolated or resonate with other points or lines.

A line is the product of a force which has been applied in a given direction: the force exerted on the pencil or paintbrush by the artist. The produced linear forms may be of several types: a straight line, which results from a unique force applied in a single direction; an angular line, resulting from the alternation of two forces in different directions, or a curved (or wave-like) line, produced by the effect of two forces acting simultaneously. A plane may be obtained by condensation (from a line rotated around one of its ends).
The subjective effect produced by a line depends on its orientation: a horizontal line corresponds with the ground on which man rests and moves; it possesses a dark and cold affective tonality similar to black or blue. A vertical line corresponds with height, and offers no support; it possesses a luminous, warm tonality close to white and yellow. A diagonal possesses a more-or-less warm (or cold) tonality, according to its inclination toward the horizontal or the vertical.

A force which deploys itself, without obstacle, as the one which produces a straight line corresponds with lyricism; several forces which confront (or annoy) each other form a drama. The angle formed by the angular line also has an inner sonority which is warm and close to yellow for an acute angle (a triangle), cold and similar to blue for an obtuse angle (a circle), and similar to red for a right angle (a square).

The basic plane is, in general, rectangular or square. Therefore, it is composed of horizontal and vertical lines which delimit it and define it as an autonomous entity which supports the painting, communicating its affective tonality. This tonality is determined by the relative importance of horizontal and vertical lines: the horizontals giving a calm, cold tonality to the basic plane while the verticals impart a calm, warm tonality. The artist intuits the inner effect of the canvas format and dimensions, which he chooses according to the tonality he wants to give to his work. Kandinsky considered the basic plane a living being, which the artist "fertilises" and feels "breathing".

Each part of the basic plane possesses an affective colouration; this influences the tonality of the pictorial elements which will be drawn on it, and contributes to the richness of the composition resulting from their juxtaposition on the canvas. The above of the basic plane corresponds with looseness and to lightness, while the below evokes condensation and heaviness. The painter's job is to listen and know these effects to produce paintings which are not just the effect of a random process, but the fruit of authentic work and the result of an effort towards inner beauty.

This book contains many photographic examples and drawing from Kandinsky's works which offer the demonstration of its theoretical observations, and which allow the reader to reproduce in him the inner obviousness provided that he takes the time to look at those pictures with care, that he let them acting on its own sensibility and that he let vibrating the sensible and spiritual strings of his soul.

Personal life
After graduating in 1892, Kandinsky married his cousin, Anja Chimiakin, and became a lecturer on Jurisprudence at the University of Moscow.

In the summer of 1902, Kandinsky invited Gabriele Münter to join him at his summer painting classes just south of Munich in the Alps. She accepted, and their relationship became more personal than professional. In 1911, the German expressionist painter was one of several artists joining Kandinsky in his Blue Rider (Der Blaue Reiter) group, which ended with the onset of World War I.

Kandinsky and Münter became engaged in the summer of 1903, while he was still married to Anja, and travelled extensively through Europe, Russia and North Africa until 1908. He separated from Anja in 1911.

From 1906 to 1908 Kandinsky travelled across Europe until he settled in the small Bavarian town of Murnau.

He returned to Moscow in 1914 when the first World War broke out. In 1916, he met Nina Nikolaevna Andreevskaya (1899–1980), whom he married on 11 February 1917, when she was 17 or 18 and he was 50 years old. At the end of 1917 they had a son, Wsevolod, or Lodya as he was called in the family. Lodya died in June 1920. There were no more children.

After the Russian Revolution, he had opportunities in Germany, to which he returned in 1920. There he taught at the Bauhaus school of art and architecture from 1922 until the Nazis closed it in 1933.

He then moved to France with his wife, where he lived for the rest of his life, becoming a French citizen in 1939 and producing some of his most prominent art.

He died in Neuilly-sur-Seine on 13 December 1944, three days prior to his 78th birthday.

Miscellaneous information

Art market 
In 2012, Christie's auctioned Kandinsky's Studie für Improvisation 8 (Study for Improvisation 8), a 1909 view of a man wielding a broadsword in a rainbow-hued village, for $23 million. The painting had been on loan to the Kunstmuseum Winterthur, Switzerland, since 1960 and was sold to a European collector by the Volkart Foundation, the charitable arm of the Swiss commodities trading firm Volkart Brothers. Before this sale, the artist's last record was set in 1990 when Sotheby's sold his Fugue (1914) for $20.9 million. On 16 November 2016 Christie's auctioned Kandinsky's Rigide et courbé (rigid and bent), a large 1935 abstract painting, for $23.3 million, a new record for Kandinsky. Solomon R. Guggenheim originally purchased the painting directly from the artist in 1936, but it was not exhibited after 1949, and was then sold at auction to a private collector in 1964 by the Solomon R. Guggenheim Museum.

In popular culture 
The 1990 play Six Degrees of Separation refers to a "double-sided Kandinsky" painting. No such painting is known to exist; in the 1993 film version of the play, the double-sided painting is portrayed as having Kandinsky's 1913 painting Black Lines on one side and his 1926 painting Several Circles on the other side.

The 1999 film Double Jeopardy makes numerous references to Kandinsky, and a piece of his, Sketch, figures prominently in the plot-line. The protagonist, Elizabeth Parsons (Ashley Judd), utilises the registry entry for the work to track down her husband under his new alias. Two variations of the almanac cover of Blue Rider are also featured in the film.

In 2014, Google commemorated Kandinsky's 148th birthday by featuring a Google Doodle based on his abstract paintings.

In the 2015 movie Longest ride there is a story within the story telling about Ruth and Ira. Ruth is interested in art and they visit the Black Mountain College where Ruth tells Ira about Kandinski who came along and broke all the laws of the discipline.

In Season 4 of Netflix's Stranger Things, his 1903 colour woodblock "The Singer" can be seen in Nancy Wheeler's bedroom. This specific season has strong themes about the power of music.

A picture-book biography entitled The Noisy Paint Box: The Colors and Sounds of Kandinsky's Abstract Art was published in 2014.  Its illustrations by Mary GrandPre earned it a 2015 Caldecott Honor.

His grandson was musicology professor and writer Aleksey Ivanovich Kandinsky (1918–2000), whose career was both focused on and centred in Russia.

Exhibitions 
The Solomon R. Guggenheim Museum will stage the exhibition Vasily Kandinsky: Around the Circle from October 8, 2021 to September 5, 2022, in conjunction with a series of solo exhibitions featuring the work of contemporary artists Etel Adnan, Jennie C. Jones, and Cecilia Vicuña.
The Solomon R. Guggenheim Museum held a major retrospective of Kandinsky's work from 2009 to 2010, called Kandinsky. In 2017, a selection of Kandinsky's work was on view at the Guggenheim, "Visionaries: Creating a Modern Guggenheim".
The Phillips Collection in Washington, D.C., held an exhibit from June 11 to September 4, 2011, called ″Kandinsky and the Harmony of Silence,″ featuring ″Painting with White Border″ and its preparatory studies.
Kandinskij. L'opera 1900–1940, Rovigo, Italy.

Nazi-looted art 
In July 2001 Jen Lissitzky, the son of artist El Lissitzky, filed a restitution claim against the Beyeler Foundation in Basel, Switzerland for Kandinsky's "Improvisation No. 10". A settlement was reached in 2002.

In 2013 the Lewenstein family filed a claim for the restitution of Kandinsky's Painting with Houses held by the Stedelijk Museum.  In 2020, a committee established by the Dutch minister of culture found fault with the behaviour of the Restitution Committee, causing a scandal where two of its members, including its chairman, resigned. Later that year, a court in Amsterdam ruled that the Stedelijk Museum could retain the painting from the Jewish Lewenstein collection, despite the Nazi theft. However, in August 2021 the Amsterdam City Council decided to return the painting to the Lewenstein family.

In 2017 Robert Colin Lewenstein, Francesca Manuela Davis and Elsa Hannchen Guidotti filed suit against  Bayerische Landesbank ("BLB") for the restitution of Kandinsky's  Das Bunte Leben.

See also 

 Bibliothèque Kandinsky
 Goethe's Theory of Colours
 Kandinsky and Theosophy
 Kandinsky Prize
 List of Russian artists
 Russian avant-garde
 Wassily Chair

References 
Note: Several sections of this article have been translated from its French version: Theoretical writings on art, The Bauhaus and The great synthesis artistic periods. For complete detailed references in French, see the original version at :fr:Vassily Kandinsky.

Notes

Books by Kandinsky 
 Wassily Kandinsky, M. T. Sadler (Translator), Adrian Glew (Editor). Concerning the Spiritual in Art. (New York: MFA Publications and London: Tate Publishing, 2001). 192pp.  
 Wassily Kandinsky, M. T. Sadler (Translator). Concerning the Spiritual in Art. Dover Publ. (Paperback). 80 pp. . or: Lightning Source Inc Publ. (Paperback). 
 Wassily Kandinsky. Klänge. Verlag R. Piper & Co., Munich
 Wassily Kandinsky. Point and Line to Plane. Dover Publications, New York. 
 Wassily Kandinsky. Kandinsky, Complete Writings on Art. Da Capo Press.

References in English 
 Ulrike Becks-Malorny. Wassily Kandinsky 1866–1944: The Journey to Abstraction (Taschen, 2007). 
 John E. Bowlt and Rose-Carol Washton Long, eds. The Life of Vasilii Kandinsky in Russian Art: A Study of "On the Spiritual in Art" by Wassily Kandinsky. (Newtonville, MA.: Oriental Research Partners, 1984). 
 Magdalena Dabrowski. Kandinsky Compositions. (New York: Museum of Modern Art, 2002). 
 Esther da Costa Meyer, Fred Wasserman, eds. Schoenberg, Kandinsky, and the Blue Rider (New York: The Jewish Museum, and London: Scala Publishers Ltd, 2003). 
 Hajo Düchting. Wassily Kandinsky 1866–1944: A Revolution in Painting. (Taschen, 2000). 
 Hajo Düchting. Wassily Kandinsky. (Prestel, 2008).
 Sabine Flach. "Through the Looking Glass", in Intellectual Birdhouse (London: Koenig Books, 2012). 
 Will Grohmann. Wassily Kandinsky: Life and Work. (New York: Harry N. Abrams, Inc., 1958).
 Michel Henry. Seeing the Invisible: On Kandinsky (Continuum, 2009). 
 Thomas M. Messer. Vasily Kandinsky. (New York: Harry N Abrams Inc, 1997). (Illustrated). .
 Margarita Tupitsyn. Against Kandinsky (Munich: Museum Villa Stuck, 2006).
 Annette and Luc Vezin. Kandinsky and the Blue Rider (Paris: Pierre Terrail, 1992). 
 Julian Lloyd Webber. "Seeing red, looking blue, feeling green", The Daily Telegraph 6 July 2006.
 Peg Weiss. Kandinsky in Munich: The Formative Jugendstil Years (Princeton: Princeton University Press, 1979).

References in French 
 Michel Henry. Voir l'invisible. Sur Kandinsky (Presses Universitaires de France) 
 Nina Kandinsky. Kandinsky et moi (éd. Flammarion) 
 Jéléna Hahl-Fontaine. Kandinsky (Marc Vokar éditeur) 
 François le Targat. Kandinsky (éd. Albin Michel, les grands maîtres de l'art contemporain) 
 Kandinsky. Rétrospective (Foundation Maeght)  
 Kandinsky. Œuvres de Vassily Kandinsky (1866–1944) (Centre Georges Pompidou)

External links 

 Video remake of the stage production of "Pictures at an Exhibition" by Kandinsky in 1928 in Dessau, 2015.
 Wassily Kandinsky papers, 1911–1940. The Getty Research Institute, Los Angeles, California.
 Discussion of Yellow – Red – Blue by Janina Ramirez and Marc Canham: Art Detective Podcast, 19 April 2017
Kandinsky's Introspective Path to Abstract Reality

Writing by Kandinsky
 
 
 
 

Paintings by Kandinsky
 
 Artcyclopedia.com, Wassily Kandinsky at ArtCyclopedia
  Glyphs.com, Kandinsky's compositions with commentary
 Wassilykandinsky.net – 500 paintings, 60+ photos, biography, quotes, articles

 
1866 births
1944 deaths
Abstract painters
Academy of Fine Arts, Munich alumni
Art educators
Academic staff of the Bauhaus
French people of Russian descent
Emigrants from the Russian Empire to France
Modern artists
Moscow State University alumni
Orientalist painters
Artists from Moscow
Russian Expressionist painters
Russian people of German descent
Gantimurov family
Russian avant-garde
Russian male painters
Russian Orthodox Christians from Russia
Russian printmakers
Russian watercolorists
Russian people of East Asian descent
Burials at Neuilly-sur-Seine community cemetery
Artists from Odesa